Punan Tubu is one of several Punan languages of Indonesian Borneo.

References

Punan languages
Languages of Indonesia
Endangered Austronesian languages